Omar Nguale Ilunga best known as Ion Real Deal (born in 1984), is an Italian rapper, boxer and actor, born from a Tunisian mother and a Congolese father.

He sings in Italian and French.

Discography

Solo albums
 2009 – Forever Free  
 2012 – REAL DEAL

With Goodfellas
 2010 - Crew Internazionale
 2014 - GoodFellas vol.1

Filmography
 2011 - Tiberio Mitri - Il Campione e la miss
 2013 - Tulpa - Perdizioni mortali

References

Italian rappers
1984 births
Living people
Italian people of Tunisian descent
Italian people of Democratic Republic of the Congo descent